Mohammad-Kazem Anbarlouei is an Iranian conservative politician and journalist.

He was a former editor-in-chief of the right-wing Resalat newspaper.

Anbarlouei is a senior member of the Islamic Coalition Party and held office as head of its political bureau.

References

1957 births
Living people
Iranian journalists
Islamic Coalition Party politicians
Islamic Republican Party politicians